St. Mary's Forane Church is a Syro-Malabar Catholic church in Karimannoor panchayath, 10 km away from Thodupuzha, in the Eparchy of Kothamangalam.

Churches in Idukki district
Syro-Malabar Catholic church buildings
Eastern Catholic churches in Kerala
Churches completed in 1902